Adventure is a novel by Jack London released in 1911 by The Macmillan Company.

Overview
The novel explores the themes of domination of one people over the others, the differences between races and the strength of the human spirit, strengthened in a struggle with the nature and society.

References

External links
 
 Authographed copy

1911 American novels
Novels by Jack London